Linda Liao (now known as 廖語晴; born 24 May 1981) is a Taiwanese singer, actress, VJ and professional gamer. She attended Queen's University in Kingston, Ontario, Canada.

Discography

Studio albums
2002 August – Linda 7
2004 June   – 我挺你
2011 May 27 – Love Presents 爱。现

Filmography

Film
Twisted (2011)
Fishing Luck (2005)

Television series

External links

 Linda blog

1981 births
Living people
Taiwanese indigenous peoples
Taiwanese television actresses
Queen's University at Kingston alumni
Taiwanese film actresses
Taiwanese television presenters
21st-century Taiwanese singers
21st-century Taiwanese actresses
21st-century Taiwanese women singers
Taiwanese women television presenters